Mercer County Courthouse is an historic county courthouse located at Mercer, Mercer County, Pennsylvania.  It was designed by the noted Youngstown architectural firm of Owsley & Boucherle and built in 1910–1911.  It is a three-story, rectangular red brick and light sandstone building in the Beaux-Arts style  It measures 180 feet wide and 92 feet deep. It features a tall bell and clock tower.  Also on the property are the contributing resources: the Mercer County Soldiers' Monument and old Mercer County Jail, or South Court House Annex.

It was added to the National Register of Historic Places in 1998.

References

County courthouses in Pennsylvania
Courthouses on the National Register of Historic Places in Pennsylvania
Beaux-Arts architecture in Pennsylvania
Government buildings completed in 1911
Buildings and structures in Mercer County, Pennsylvania
1911 establishments in Pennsylvania
National Register of Historic Places in Mercer County, Pennsylvania